Patrick Joseph A. Dowling, CBE FRS (born 1939) is an Irish engineer and educationalist.

Early life 
He was born in Sandymount, Dublin and educated at University College Dublin, graduating in 1960 with a degree in civil engineering.

Career 
He then went to work at Imperial College London, where in 1986 he was appointed to their chair in structural engineering, which he held for the next 15 years. He was afterwards Vice-Chancellor and Chief Executive of the University of Surrey from October 1994 to his retirement in June 2005.

In 1996, he was elected a Fellow of the Royal Society.

He has served as President of the Institution of Structural Engineers (1994–95), Chairman of the Steel Construction Institute, Vice-President of the Royal Academy of Engineering, Chairman of the Engineering Council, President of the Association for Science Education and as Chairman of the British Association for the Advancement of Science. He was appointed Deputy Lieutenant of Surrey in 1999 and appointed a CBE in the New Year Honours List of 2001 "for his contribution to industry/university relations". In 2006 he was awarded the James Alfred Ewing Medal of the Institution of Civil Engineers.

Personal life 
He is married to Grace Lobo, an Indian from Zanzibar, who in 2004 became the first High Sheriff of Surrey to be appointed from an ethnic minority.

Works 
He has co-written 6 books on subjects in his field of offshore oil platforms, including:
 "Buckling of shells in offshore structures", by J.E. Harding, Patrick Joseph Dowling and N. Agelidis, Granada, 1982
"Structural Steel Design", by Dowling, P.J., Knowles, P. and Owens, G.W., Butterworths, London, 1988

References

1939 births
Living people
Engineers from Dublin (city)
Alumni of University College Dublin
Irish civil engineers
Fellows of the Royal Society
Deputy Lieutenants of Surrey
Commanders of the Order of the British Empire
Presidents of the Association for Science Education
People associated with the University of Surrey